Jazeh (also Romanized as Jezeh; also known as Gazeh) is a village in Kuhpayeh Rural District, in the Central District of Kashan County, Isfahan Province, Iran. At the 2006 census, its population was 288, in 83 families.

References 

Populated places in Kashan County